United States Post Office is located on 251 W. Lancaster Avenue in Fort Worth, Texas. Designed by Wyatt C. Hedrick, the building opened on February 22, 1933. Composed of Cordova limestone, the three-story rectangular building was designed in the Beaux Arts style. In 2014, the building was placed on the "Most Endangered Places" list by Historic Fort Worth, Inc.  The building was added to the National Register 1985.

The building contains New Deal murals commissioned by the Public Works of Art Project in 1934, created by Fort Worth artists Dwight Clay Holmes and William Henry Baker.

See also

National Register of Historic Places listings in Tarrant County, Texas
Recorded Texas Historic Landmarks in Tarrant County

References

External links

Architecture in Fort Worth: United States Post Office

Government buildings completed in 1933
National Register of Historic Places in Fort Worth, Texas
Post office buildings on the National Register of Historic Places in Texas
Beaux-Arts architecture in Texas
Buildings and structures in Fort Worth, Texas